Zobellia amurskyensis is a Gram-negative, heterotrophic and aerobic bacterium from the genus of Zobellia.

References

Flavobacteria
Bacteria described in 2004